is a city located in Aichi Prefecture, Japan. Komaki is commonly associated with the former Komaki Airport, which is located on the border between Komaki and neighboring Kasugai.

Geography

Komaki is located in the middle of the Nōbi Plain, west-central Aichi Prefecture, north of the Nagoya metropolis. The city skyline is dominated by Mount Komaki, which is topped with Komaki Castle.

Climate
The city has a climate characterized by hot and humid summers, and relatively mild winters (Köppen climate classification Cfa).

Demographics
Per Japanese census data, the population of Komaki has increased rapidly over the past 60 years.

Surrounding municipalities
Aichi Prefecture
Kasugai
Inuyama
Iwakura
Kōnan
Kitanagoya
Toyoyama
Ōguchi

History

Ancient history
Archaeological remains from the Japanese Paleolithic through Yayoi period have been found in what is now Komaki, and burial tumuli from the Kofun period are also common.

Middle Ages
During the Sengoku period, Oda Nobunaga used Komaki Castle as his headquarters from which he launched his invasion of Mino Province and later the area surrounding Mount Komaki was the site of the Battle of Komaki and Nagakute in 1584.

Early modern period
It was part of the holdings of Owari Domain during the Edo period, and prospered as a post town on the route connecting Nagoya with the Nakasendō highway.

Late modern period
During the Meiji period establishment of the modern municipalities system, the area was organized into villages under Higashikasugai District, Aichi.
Komaki was proclaimed a town on July 16, 1906 through the merger of four villages.

Contemporary history
Komaki was raised to city status on January 1, 1955, after merging with the village of Kitasato in Nishikasugai District, Aichi.

Government

Komaki has a mayor-council form of government with a directly elected mayor and a unicameral city legislature of 25 members. The city contributes two members to the Aichi Prefectural Assembly.  In terms of national politics, the city is part of Aichi District 6 of the lower house of the Diet of Japan.

External relations

Twin towns – Sister cities

International
Sister cities
Wyandotte（Michigan, United States of America）
since March 22, 1967 - Each year, Wyandotte and Komaki have an exchange student program, allowing students to be hosted by a family in the other city.
Friendship city
Anyang（Gyeonggi Province, South Korea）
since August 1979  (friendship city since 1986)

National
Friendship city
Yakumo（Oshima Subprefecture, Hokkaido）
since October 24, 1986

Economy

Komaki has a mixed economy, with agriculture (rice and horticulture), commence, and light manufacturing industries playing important roles.

Primary sector of the economy

Agriculture
Peach
Rice

Poultry farming
Nagoya Cochin chicken

Secondary sector of the economy

Manufacturing
Sumitomo Riko (Previously known as Tokai Gomme), a global rubber and synthetic resin products manufacturing company, whose automotive anti-vibration components hold the largest global market share, has its headquarters in the city.

Tertiary sector of the economy

Commerce
Due to its highway connections with the Nagoya metropolis, it is also becoming a bedroom community.

Companies headquartered in Komaki
COMO
SATO FOODS INDUSTRIES
santec
CKD Corporation
Sumitomo Riko
Taihei Machinery Works
Tsunoda Co
HOUTOKU Co

Education

Universities
Aichi Bunkyo University
Nagoya Zokei University

Schools
Elementary and secondary education
Komaki has 16 public elementary schools and nine public junior high schools operated by the city government, and three public high schools operated by the Aichi Prefectural Board of Education. There is also one private high school. The prefecture also operates one special education school for the handicapped.

International School
The Colégio Dom Bosco, a Brazilian school was formerly located in Komaki.

Transportation

Airways

Airports
Nagoya Airport (Komaki Airport)

Railways

Conventional lines
Meitetsu
Komaki Line：-  -  -  -  -  -

Roads

Expressways
 Chūō Expressway
Meishin Expressway (Asian Highway Network)
 Tōmei Expressway (Asian Highway Network)
 Route 11 (Nagoya Expressway)

Japan National Route

Local attractions

Historic sites
Mount Komaki (Komaki Castle)
Ryūon-ji temple(Mama Kannon)
Tagata Jinja
Komaki shuku (Kishida house)
Iwaya Kofun
Shinooka Kiln ruins

Parks
Menard Art Museum
Shimin Shiki no Mori
Komaki Municipal Baseball Stadium
Park Arena Komaki

Culture

Festivals
Hōnen Matsuri, and annual fertility festival held on March 15 at Tagata Shrine.
Bamboo Installation

Sports

Noted people from Komaki
Asuka Teramoto, Olympic gymnast
Jōtarō Watanabe, Imperial Japanese Army general
Minoru Tanaka, professional wrestler
Miku Ishida, singer, gravure artist
AK-69, hip-hop artist
Kohei Hirate, professional race car driver
Masanari Omura, professional footballer

References

External links

 

 
Cities in Aichi Prefecture